Euploea morosa is a butterfly in the family Nymphalidae. It was described by Arthur Gardiner Butler in 1866. It is found in the Australasian realm.

Subspecies
E. m. morosa (Ternate, Bachan, Halmahera, Obi)
E. m. lugubris (Grose-Smith, 1894)  (Biak)

References

External links
Euploea at Markku Savela's Lepidoptera and Some Other Life Forms

Euploea
Butterflies described in 1866
Butterflies of Indonesia
Taxa named by Arthur Gardiner Butler